A national secondary road is a category of road in Ireland. These roads form an important part of the national route network but are secondary to the main arterial routes which are classified as national primary roads. National secondary roads are designated with route numbers higher than those used for primary roads, but with the same "N" prefix. Routes N51 and higher are all national secondary roads.

National secondary roads have a default speed limit of 100 km/h (62.5 mph) as, along with national primary routes, they fall into the speed limit category of national roads.

There are 2657 km of national secondary roads in Ireland, making up slightly over 50% of the entire national route (national primary and national secondary) network. National secondary routes are generally more poorly maintained than primary routes (although their quality can vary widely), but often carry more traffic than regional roads. Almost the entire network of national secondary roads is single carriageway, although there are some short sections of dual carriageway on the Tallaght bypass section of the N81, on the N52 at Dundalk, on the N85 at Ennis, on
the N62 at Athlone, on both the N69 and N70 at Tralee  and on the N71 between Cork and Bandon. Typically, national secondary roads are of a similar standard or higher than regional roads although some are of lower quality than the better sections of regional roads. Many of them have been resurfaced with higher quality pavements in recent years with relatively smooth surfaces and good road markings and signposting. However, road widths and alignments are often inadequate, with many narrow and winding sections. 
 
In the past, most national secondary roads would have run through the centres of the towns on their routes; however, recently, that is less often the case. For example: 
The N52 bypasses Nenagh (together with the M7), Tullamore, Mullingar, Kells and the centre of Dundalk (as a relief road)
The N55 (together with the N3) bypasses Cavan.
The N56 forms part of the Donegal bypass and the Mountcharles bypass. 
The N69 and N70 form part of the Tralee bypass. 
The N71 bypasses Halfway and Skibbereen. 
The N74 (together with the M8) bypasses Cashel. 
The N76 bypasses Callan. 
The N77 forms the northern part of the Kilkenny ring road. 
The N80 bypasses Carlow. 
The N85 bypasses Ennis (together with the M18).

The former N8 bypass of Mitchelstown was re-classified as the N73 when the Fermoy (Moorepark) to Kilbehenny section of the M8 was completed.

Most national secondary roads were originally Trunk Roads under the old system of road classification in Ireland, although some sections of national secondary routes were formerly Link Roads. Many less important Trunk Roads became regional roads when the road classification system changed from 1977 onward, including some roads, such as the N72 between Killarney and Killorglin, the N86 and the N87, which were originally re-classified as regional roads but later re-classified again as national secondary routes. In 1994, three national secondary roads were reclassified as national primary roads: the N57 between Swinford and Ballina became the N26, the N64 between Oranmore and Claregalway became part of the N18 and the N79 between New Ross and Enniscorthy became the N30. In addition, a section of the N60 between Castlebar and Westport became part of the N5.

Some national secondary roads, though not arterial routes between major cities, connect scenic areas to major population centres. For example, the N59 through County Galway and County Mayo, the N70 road through County Kerry (see Ring of Kerry) and the N71 through West Cork. For this reason, many national secondary roads are well-travelled by tourists.

List of national secondary roads 

(XXXX) = Junction with road XXXX, e.g. (N21) = Junction with N21 road

Defunct routes 
 N57 road – Defunct route designation. Swinford – Ballina route prior to its redesignation as the N26 National primary road.
 N64 road  – Defunct route designation. Oranmore – Claregalway route prior to its redesignation as the N18 National primary road.
  N66 road - Defunct route designation. Gort - Loughrea route prior to its redesignation as the R380 Regional road. 
 N79 road  – Defunct route designation. Enniscorthy – New Ross route prior to its redesignation as the N30 National primary road.

Gallery

See also 
Roads in Ireland
Motorways in the Republic of Ireland
National primary road
Regional road
Local Roads in Ireland
Atlantic Corridor
Dublin Port Tunnel
Jack Lynch Tunnel
History of Roads in Ireland
Trunk Roads in Ireland
Transport Infrastructure Ireland
Road signs in the Republic of Ireland
Road speed limits in the Republic of Ireland
Vehicle registration plates of Ireland
Northern Irish Vehicle Registration Plates
Transport in Ireland
List of Ireland-related topics

References 

S.I. No. 209/1994: Roads Act, 1993 (Declaration of National Roads) Order, 1994
Roads Act 1993 (Classification of National Roads) Order 2006 – Department of Transport
 - National Roads Authority: National Route Lengths 2007

Roads in the Republic of Ireland
Types of roads